The Curtiss Model 57 Teal was an American monoplane amphibian designed and built by the Curtiss Aeroplane and Motor Company. Two versions were built, a three-seater and four-seater but only one of each was built.

The Teal was a monoplane amphibian with the pusher engine pod-mounted above the wing center section. It was designed for the private user, but due to the economic pressures of 1930s America only one three-seater, Teal A-1 registered N969V and a four-seater Teal B-1 registered N970V were built.

Variants
Teal A-1
Three-seater variant with a 165hp (123kW) Wright J6-5 piston engine.
Teal B-1
Four-seater variant with a 225hp (168kW) Wright J-6-7 piston engine.

Specifications (Teal A-1)

See also

Citations

Bibliography

 
 

Flying boats
Teal
Single-engined pusher aircraft
1930s United States civil aircraft
Amphibious aircraft
High-wing aircraft